The Old River Control Structure is a floodgate system in a branch of the Mississippi River in central Louisiana.  It regulates the flow of water from the Mississippi into the Atchafalaya River, thereby preventing the Mississippi River from changing course.  Completed in 1963, the complex was built by the U.S. Army Corps of Engineers in a side channel of the Mississippi known as "Old River", between the Mississippi's current channel and the Atchafalaya Basin, a former channel of the Mississippi.  

The Old River Control Structure is a complex containing the original low-sill and overbank structures, as well as the auxiliary structure that was constructed after the low-sill structure was damaged during the Mississippi River Flood of 1973.  The complex also contains a navigation lock and the Sidney A. Murray Jr. Hydroelectric Station.

Old River 

Before the 15th century, the Red River and Mississippi River were entirely separate and flowed more or less parallel to one another. Beginning in the 15th century, the Mississippi River created a small, westward, oxbow loop, later called Turnbull's Bend, near present-day Angola, Louisiana. This loop eventually intersected the Red River, making the downstream part of the Red River a distributary of the Mississippi; this distributary came to be called the Atchafalaya River.

To reduce travel time, Captain Henry M. Shreve, a river engineer and namesake of Shreveport, Louisiana, dug a canal in 1831 through the neck of Turnbull's Bend; this canal became known as Shreve's Cut. At the next high water, the Mississippi roared through this channel. The upper portion of Turnbull's Bend was referred to as Upper Old River, while the larger, lower portion became known as the Lower Old River.

At first, the Lower Old River would flow eastward, to the Mississippi, until 1839, when locals began removing the Great Raft, a natural log jam that was obstructing the Atchafalaya River. The project was finished in 1840. After that, the Lower Old River would flow eastward to the Mississippi when the Red River was high and the Mississippi was low, and westward to the Atchafalaya when the Mississippi was high and the Red River was low. Over time, the number of days when the river flowed east to the Mississippi decreased and the number of days when the river flowed west increased, until eventually the Lower Old River flowed west over half the time. By 1880, it rarely flowed eastward and was rapidly capturing more and more of the flow of the Mississippi. With this increased water flow, the channel of the Atchafalaya River was worn deeper and wider throughout the 1800s and early 1900s.

In this case, latitude flow is a combination of the flows of the Mississippi and Atchafalaya rivers as they cross an imaginary line at that latitude.

Between 1850 and 1950, the percentage of latitude flow entering the Atchafalaya River had increased from less than 10 percent to about 30 percent. By 1953, the U.S. Army Corps of Engineers concluded that the Mississippi River could change its course to the Atchafalaya River by 1990 if it were not controlled, since this alternative path to the Gulf of Mexico through the Atchafalaya River is much shorter and steeper.

The Corps completed construction on the Old River Control Structure in 1963 to prevent the main channel flow of the Mississippi River from altering its current course to the Gulf of Mexico through the natural geologic process of avulsion. Historically, this natural process of course change has occurred about every 1,000 years, and is overdue. Some researchers believe the likelihood of this event increases each year, despite manmade artificial control efforts.

If the Mississippi diverts its main channel to the Atchafalaya Basin and the Atchafalaya River, it would develop a new delta south of Morgan City in southern Louisiana, greatly reducing water flow to its present channel through Baton Rouge and New Orleans, with adverse economic effects on both port cities. The Mississippi Flood of 1973 almost caused the control structure to fail. Maintenance of the integrity of the Old River Control Structure, the nearby Morganza Spillway, and other levees in the area is essential to prevent such a diversion.  Jeff Masters of Weather Underground noted that failure of that complex "would be a serious blow to the U.S. economy."

Components 

The present Old River Control Structure was completed in 1964 and expanded in 1990.  The first two floodgates are the Low Sill Control Structure, which regulates routine flow in the waterway, and the Overbank Control Structure, in use only when the Mississippi exceeds its banks. A navigation channel and lock were also part of the original facility design.  Subsequent expansion created what is now known as the Old River Control Complex, when the Auxiliary Structure, which became operational in 1986, was added to reduce pressure on the original floodgates after extensive damage caused by the flood of 1973. The Sidney A. Murray Jr. Hydroelectric Station, completed in 1990, also provides an additional measure of control at the site.

All four structures in the complex carry Louisiana Highway 15 over the Old River from north to south.

Operation 
Water from the Mississippi is normally diverted into the Atchafalaya Basin only at Old River, where floodgates are routinely used to redirect the Mississippi's flow into the Atchafalaya River, such that the volume of the two rivers is split 70%/30%, respectively, as measured at the latitude of Red River Landing. This flow split was not based on science, but rather was based on the approximate flow allocation between the two rivers that existed at the time of construction.

Water diverted at Old River flows into the Atchafalaya Basin, first entering the Red River, then continuing down the Atchafalaya River to the Gulf of Mexico, bypassing Baton Rouge and New Orleans (see diagram).

The Morganza Floodway, between the Mississippi and the Atchafalaya Basin nearby downstream, is normally closed. It can be opened in an emergency to relieve water levels and water-pressure stress on various levees and other flood-control structures, including the Old River Control Structure. The floodway can reduce stress by diverting additional water from the Mississippi into the Atchafalaya. The Morganza Floodway was never used before the construction of Old River Control Structure, and as of 2016 has been opened only twice  for flood control since completion of the Old River Control Structure.

See also 
Lower Mississippi River

References

External sources 

Rivers of Louisiana
Buildings and structures in Concordia Parish, Louisiana
Dikes in the United States
United States Army Corps of Engineers dams
1963 establishments in Louisiana